The Spyker 60 HP racing car, probably built in 1902, but presented in 1903, was the world's first petrol-fuelled four-wheel drive car.

Known as "the car of three firsts", with a top speed of 80 mph (129 km/h) to 90 mph, it was manufactured by the Dutch carriage and automobile maker Spyker, set up in 1880 by blacksmiths Jacobus and Hendrik-Jan Spijker, and also featured the first application of a six-cylinder engine (an 8.8-litre inline design), (straight-six engine) as well as the first four-wheel braking system.

The 60 HP was commissioned by Jacobus Spijker for the 1903 Paris–Madrid race (although Bill Boddy, in a 1995 article for Motor Sport, states the Gordon Bennett race, the fore-runner of the Grand Prix that would be staged at Le Mans in 1906). The Belgian engineer Joseph Valentin Laviolette already had a design for an engine with six separate cylinders, and he designed a transmission that drove the front as well as the rear wheels, by extending the cardan-shaft from the gearbox extend forward, as well as fitting a transmission brake.

However, the car was not ready in time for the race in May and was not launched until December 1903, in Paris, going on display two months later at The Crystal Palace in London.

The Spyker 60 HP racing car only raced twice; at Blackpool, in 1904, where it finished third, and at Birmingham, in 1906, where it won.

The model on show at the Louwman Museum, in The Hague, Netherlands, was acquired in 1993 after having been housed at various Dutch museums. It was restored over a five-year period to its original condition as displayed at The Crystal Palace in 1904.

References

Vehicles introduced in 1903
1900s cars